Saint Abraham the Poor (also Saint Abraham the Child and Abraham the Simple) was a fourth-century Egyptian hermit and a saint.

Life
Born in the town of Menuf, he became a disciple of Saint Pachomius, who founded cenobitic monasticism, in the Delta region of the Nile River. He remained a disciple of Saint Pachomius for 23 years, after which he spent the following seventeen years as a cave hermit. His nicknames of "the poor" and "the child" refer to his simple life and simple faith. His feast  day is celebrated on 27 October.

Notes

References
Holweck, F. G., A Biographical Dictionary of the Saints. St. Louis, MO: B. Herder Book Co. 1924.

External links

myspace.com/abrahamthepoor

4th-century births
372 deaths
Saints from Roman Egypt
4th-century Christian saints